The Jinnah University for Women (JUW) is a private research university in Karachi, Sindh, Pakistan. It is an all-woman university and is the first women's university in the country.

Established as a post-graduate college, its status as full-fledged university was upgraded in 1998 the Sindh Assembly. Major financial endowment and funding are managed by the Anjuman-e-Islam Trust. The university offers undergraduate, post-graduate, and doctoral programmes in science, arts, humanities, and general studies. As of 2010, the university was ranked among top institution of higher learning in "general category" by the HEC.

The Founder 

Al Haj Moulvi Rayazuddin Ahmed (Tamgha-e-Imtiaz), a direct descendant of Sheikh Saleem Uddin Chishty, was born in 1906 in the city of Taj Mahal, the city of intellectuals and poets. His early upbringing through parents and education instilled in him love for education in spite of being enslaved in government service.

In that era of conventional thoughts and traditional values he envisaged that female education was of paramount importance. His revolutionary thoughts clashed with the norms of his day but his commitment and dedication to women literacy did not subside. He was the founder of Anjuman-e-Islamia Trust which heralded the inception of many educational institutions. He was, in a way, pioneer of Muslims female education in this area.

Campus 

The Jinnah University campus is divided into five blocks — Block A, Block B, Block C, Block D, Block E — and Admissions section. These blocks include an auditorium with the capacity of 400 persons, lecture halls, classrooms, laboratories, museums, faculty rooms and seminar libraries. The university is in Nazimabad, Karachi.

References

External links 
Jinnah University for Women Website

Private universities and colleges in Sindh
Educational institutions established in 1998
Jinnah University for Women
1998 establishments in Pakistan
Memorials to Muhammad Ali Jinnah